The Carlton Trail Railway  is a shortline railway with its headquarters in Prince Albert, Saskatchewan. It is operated by OmniTRAX, an American transportation company in Denver, Colorado. Carlton Trail has been operating on ex-Canadian National track since Dec 8, 1997; however, after the acquisition of the branch line CTRW also purchased from CN the Birch Hills-Fenton-Prince Albert branch line in 2001. Since the closure of the pulp mill in 2006, Carlton Trail has typically adhered to a schedule of twice weekly rail service, hauling approximately 2000 carloads per year. According to OmniTrax president Darcy Brede, when the mill reopens in 2014, the railway will begin six days a week service, hauling approximately 3000 carloads a year.

Shortline railways
Over the past several decades many branch lines on the prairies have been discontinued as they have not proved cost effective for the two Federally regulated rail lines, Canadian National Railway & Canadian Pacific Railway. Often these lines carry grain or ship from mills in the north, shortlines help to fill the gap and continue to provide the service of rail.  In recent years Saskatchewan has seen a large influx of shortline railways as the two Class 1s find it difficult to draw a profit from remote locations. Many shortline railways cannot afford the maintenance work the lines desperately need and often need financial assistance from the Provincial Government.

History

The Carlton Trail was originally an overland transportation route connecting Winnipeg and Fort Edmonton during the early 19th century and the latter days of the fur trade in the Northwest Territories. The Carlton Trail cut its way into what is now Saskatchewan southeast of Melville, headed in a northwesterly route towards Batoche; where the trail crossed the South Saskatchewan River and then towards Fort Carlton. The trail continued on past Fort Carlton along the northern banks of the North Saskatchewan River for another 980 km to Fort Pitt and finally terminating at Fort Edmonton.  OmniTRAX had decided during the inception of the new shortline, that it should be named after this famous trading route; hence the name of the railway being Carlton Trail Railway.

Much of the southern portion of Carlton Trail Railway's Speers Subdivision straddles the proximity of the original Carlton Trail; which would have followed the North Saskatchewan River towards the Battlefords. Carlton Trail Railway had originally taken control of the Warman subdivision and the Speers subdivision. At Warman Carlton Trail transfers onto CN and has limited trackage rights into CN's Saskatoon Chappell Yard. The Speers subdivision extends from the Speers Jct north on both former Canadian National and Canadian Pacific rail line until it reaches Meadow Lake.

The Speers subdivision proved problematic due to past neglect, and on October 7, 2008 Carlton Trail gave notice that it was discontinuing rail services to Meadow Lake on April 1, 2009. Carlton Trail continues to own the Meadow Lake Branch, but has made no indication that operations will start up anytime soon. Many rural communities however have taken interest in the line and recent discussions indicate it could be purchased by the local Rural Municipalities, under the name North Central Rail. As of November, 2010 North Central Rail Ltd and OmniTRAX have yet to reach a tentative agreement in the transfer of ownership of the Speers Subdivision. According to Ray Wilfing, chair of NCR Ltd., OmniTRAX has delayed the sale of the line by not responding to North Central's formal offer in August 2009. North Central Rail lodged a negotiating in bad faith complaint with the Highway Traffic Board in December 2009 in order to pressure OmniTRAX to return to the table to discuss the offer. OmniTRAX was given a deadline of February 15, 2010 to come up with a reasonable response to the offer for the rail line. On 15 February, OmniTRAX responded with a counteroffer that was well beyond what North Central Rail could afford. On July 16, 2010 OmniTRAX put the Speers Subdivision up for sale for 11.2 million dollars, a price the Rural Municipality of Meadow Lake along with 17 other municipalities would like a justification for. Updated 2013 Google Street View imagery of the former railway crossing on the Yellowhead Highway at Denholm, Saskatchewan (the southern terminus of the branch and only connection of the branch to the rest of the North American rail network) and various other places along the line shows that the tracks along the length of the line have been torn up and the line abandoned.

On January 17, 2001 CTR purchased the line between Prince Albert and Birch Hills (40.87 km), though this line is rarely if ever used as it serves no economical purpose. CTR also briefly controlled the Arborfield branch line when CN placed it up for sale. Due to the long distance between the Aborfield subdivision and head offices in Prince Albert, CTR placed the line up for sale and later sold it to Arborfield Thunder Rail Ltd.

Colours and Symbol
Carlton Trail's symbol is the Prairie Lily that grows abundantly in the fields and ditches in and around Prince Albert. The primary colours for the railway are green and yellow, the two primary colours synonymous with Saskatchewan and are present on both the Saskatchewan Provincial flag and the Prince Albert municipal flag. All engines in CTRW livery bear the lily, but are also similar to sister railways of Hudson Bay Railway and the now defunct Okanagan Valley Railway, in that the striping on the engines is the same except for colour. One possible reason for this is the constant exchange of motive power between OmniTRAX rail lines and the cost behind painting each engine a specific livery. Ironically, the only M420 ever painted in CTRW livery suffered a diesel fuel fire when the fuel return line leaked into the engine compartment, even after it was not recommended to be run. The engine was severely damaged outside of North Battleford and was shipped to Prince Albert to be scrapped. Due to the increased cost of painting each new engine, CTRW has now resorted to patching over the reporting mark of the former railway.

Engines

†Lease cancelled as of April 1, 2009 with the discontinuance of the Meadow Lake Branch, units sent to Hudson Bay Railway (HBRY)
‡6657 was converted into 2253, GP38-3 and then returned to Carlton Trail Railway to be utilized on Speers Subdivision

Customers
Since the closure of Weyerhaeuser Pulp & Paper Mill in Prince Albert Carlton Trail's loads have considerably gotten smaller as they have less to haul. Their primary customer in Prince Albert is the Viterra Inland Terminal, in White Star, but also serve Carrier Lumber, transport steel for a local business and serve Belle Pulses within the community of Duck Lake. Agriculture products include wheat, barley, canola, peas, flax and oats. In recent years Carlton Trail has begun to store rolling stock belonging to Class I railways. Much of the rolling stock stored along the shortline are Liquefied Petroleum Gas from the gas fields of Alberta. Carlton Trail has also serves many northern communities by hauling calcium chloride into Prince Albert where Tiger Calcium Services constructed a distribution centre located on the south side of the rail yards. Calcium chloride is used to reduce the amount of dust created on grid roads.

Post CN Era
Prince Albert's CN rail yard has gone through severe attrition since the 1990s; having lost the scale house, sanding tower, bulk fuel tanks, CN station (now a strip mall) and many other rail-related buildings. Since 1991 branchlines in the Prince Albert area began to disappear, including the abandonment of the Canadian Pacific Railway yard. Carlton Trail however began reusing the roundhouse and turntable shortly after purchasing the Canadian National line. The roundhouse provides cover for their equipment and engines (CN would leave their engines outside next to the roundhouse). Carlton Trail continues to repair cars that have been damaged during derailments along their line. In recent years, larger shortline railways have removed oddball motive power, such as ALCO and MLW units from their roster; as such Carlton Trail now strictly operates used EMD units that they have purchased. Currently the only operational engines are three GP10s that run between Saskatoon & Prince Albert.

See also

Okanagan Valley Railway
Hudson Bay Railway
Canadian National Railway
Canadian Pacific Railway
OmniTRAX
Thunder Rail Ltd.

References

External links

 
 Carlton Trail Railway
 RAC Members

Transport in Prince Albert, Saskatchewan
Railway companies established in 1997
Saskatchewan railways
OmniTRAX
Standard gauge railways in Canada